Benoît Thans (born 20 August 1964 in Liège, Belgium) is a retired Belgian footballer.

References
 
 Profile
 Profile

1964 births
Living people
Belgian footballers
Belgian expatriate footballers
Belgian Pro League players
RFC Liège players
Ligue 1 players
Expatriate footballers in France
Expatriate footballers in Switzerland
RC Lens players
Standard Liège players
Royal Antwerp F.C. players
AC Bellinzona players
K.V.C. Westerlo players
K.S.K. Beveren players
R.A.A. Louviéroise players
Footballers from Liège
Association football midfielders
Belgian expatriate sportspeople in Switzerland
Belgian expatriate sportspeople in France